Sindri Sindrason is an Icelandic journalist who works as a reporter and one of the hosts of Ísland í dag, a primetime news/talk show, on Stöð 2.

References

Living people
Year of birth missing (living people)
Icelandic journalists
Place of birth missing (living people)